Saahdiq Charles (born July 26, 1999) is an American football guard for the Washington Commanders of the National Football League (NFL). He played college football at LSU and was drafted by Washington in the fourth round of the 2020 NFL Draft. Charles was a member of the LSU team that won the 2020 College Football Playoff National Championship.

Early life and high school
Charles grew up in New Orleans until his family was displaced by Hurricane Katrina in 2005. He and his family lived in Houston, Valdosta, Georgia and Montgomery, Alabama before settling in Jackson, Mississippi. Charles attended Madison-Ridgeland Academy, where played offensive and defensive line on the football team. A 4-star recruit according to rivals.com, Charles committed to play college football at LSU over offers from Florida, Memphis, Mississippi State, Ole Miss, and Tennessee, among others.

College career
 Charles played in all 13 of the Tigers' games with nine starts as a true freshman in 2017 and was named to the Southeastern Conference (SEC) All-Freshman team. He started ten games at left tackle as a sophomore.

During his junior season, Charles was suspended for the entirety of the Tigers' non-conference schedule due to a violation of team rules, but started the final nine games of the season at left tackle as the Tigers won the 2020 National Championship. Following the end of the season, Charles declared for the 2020 NFL Draft, forgoing his senior season.

Professional career

Charles was selected by the Washington Redskins in the fourth round, 108th overall, of the 2020 NFL Draft. He signed his four-year rookie contract on July 22, 2020. After missing the first five games of the season due to injury, Charles made his NFL debut in the Week 6 game against the New York Giants. Despite taking reps in training camp at offensive tackle, the team started him at left guard replacing Wes Martin, who had struggled in first five games as the starter. Charles left the game in the first quarter due to a dislocated knee cap, and was placed on injured reserve on October 24, 2020.

Charles had his second career start and his first at tackle in a Week 8 game against the Denver Broncos in 2021. He was placed on the COVID-19 reserve list on November 9, 2021, but was placed back on the active roster seven days later. In the Week 15 and Week 16 games against the Philadelphia Eagles and Dallas Cowboys, respectively, Charles started at right guard in place of Brandon Scherff who was on the team's COVID-19 reserve list.

In Week 4 of the 2022 season, Charles took over at right guard after starter Trai Turner was benched. Following the game, Charles started at right guard for three straight games before Turner returning to the starting lineup in Week 8. On January 6, 2023, he was placed on injured reserve.

References

External links 

 
 Washington Commanders bio
 LSU Tigers bio

1999 births
Living people
African-American players of American football
American football offensive tackles
American football offensive guards
LSU Tigers football players
Players of American football from Jackson, Mississippi
Players of American football from New Orleans
Washington Commanders players
Washington Football Team players
21st-century African-American sportspeople